Aq Bolagh-e Olya (also Romanized as Āq Bolāgh-e ‘Olyā; also known as Āqbolāgh) is a village in Khararud Rural District, in the Central District of Khodabandeh County, Zanjan Province, Iran. At the 2006 census, its population was 371, in 69 families.

References 

Populated places in Khodabandeh County